The Sardinian regional election of 1953 for the Second Council took place on 14 June 1953.

Five more seats were added.

After the election Luigi Crespellani, the incumbent Christian Democratic President, was re-elected President by the Regional Council. He was later succeeded by Alfredo Corrias (1954–1955) and Giuseppe Brotzu (1955–1957).

Results

Sources: Regional Council of Sardinia and Istituto Cattaneo

References

Elections in Sardinia
1953 elections in Italy